{|

|}
MY Farley Mowat  (formerly USCGC Pea Island (WPB-1347)) is a cutter owned and operated by the Sea Shepherd Conservation Society. She is being used in their direct action campaigns against whaling and against illegal fisheries activities.

They were USCGC Block Island and USCGC Pea Island, and were renamed  and MY Farley Mowat, respectively. The Jules Verne was later renamed the  after Sea shepherd supporter John Paul DeJoria. They were joined by another ex-USCG island class cutter in December 2017, the MV Sharpie. The MY Farley Mowat is currently serving in the Sea Shepherd's Operation Milagro alongside the M/Y Sam Simon, M/V White Holly and M/V Sharpie

See also

 Neptune's Navy, Sea Shepherd fleet
 Sea Shepherd Conservation Society operations

References

External links
 Sea Shepherd Fleet

Sea Shepherd Conservation Society ships
Island-class patrol boats
1980s ships
Ships built in Lockport, Louisiana